Hollow fiber membranes (HFMs) are a class of artificial membranes containing a semi-permeable barrier in the form of a hollow fiber. Originally developed in the 1960s for reverse osmosis applications, hollow fiber membranes have since become prevalent in water treatment, desalination, cell culture, medicine, and tissue engineering. Most commercial hollow fiber membranes are packed into cartridges which can be used for a variety of liquid and gaseous separations.

Manufacturing
HFMs are commonly produced using artificial polymers. The specific production methods involved are heavily dependent on the type of polymer used as well as its molecular weight. HFM production, commonly referred to as "spinning," can be divided into four general types:
 Melt Spinning, in which a thermoplastic polymer is melted and extruded through a spinneret into air and subsequently cooled.
 Dry Spinning, in which a polymer is dissolved in an appropriate solvent and extruded through a spinneret into air.
 Dry-Jet Wet Spinning, in which a polymer is dissolved in an appropriate solvent and extruded into air and a subsequent coagulant (usually water).
 Wet spinning, in which a polymer is dissolved and extruded directly into a coagulant (usually water).

Common to each of these methods is the use of a spinneret, a device containing a needle through which solvent is extruded and an annulus through which a polymer solution is extruded. As the polymer is extruded through the annulus of the spinneret, it retains a hollow cylindrical shape. As the polymer exits the spinneret, it solidifies into a membrane through a process known as phase inversion. The properties of the membrane -such as average pore diameter and membrane thickness- can be finely tuned by changing the dimensions of the spinneret, temperature and composition of "dope" (polymer) and "bore" (solvent) solutions, length of air gap (for dry-jet wet spinning), temperature and composition of the coagulant, as well as the speed at which produced fiber is collected by a motorized spool. Extrusion of the polymer and solvent through the spinneret can be accomplished either through the use of gas-extrusion or a metered pump. Some of the polymers most commonly used for fabricating HFMs include cellulose acetate, polysulfone, polyethersulfone, and polyvinylidene fluoride.

Characterization 
The properties of HFMs can be characterized using the same techniques commonly used for other types of membranes. The primary properties of interest for HFMs are average pore diameter and pore distribution, measurable via a technique known as porosimetry, a feature of several laboratory instruments used for measuring pore size. Pore diameter can also be measured via a technique known as evapoporometry, in which evaporation of 2-propanol through the pores of a membrane is related to pore-size via the Kelvin equation. Depending on the diameters of pores in an HFM, scanning electron microscopy or transmission electron microscopy can be used to yield a qualitative perspective of pore size.

Applications

Hollow fiber membranes are ubiquitously used in industrial separations, especially the filtration of drinking water.

Industrial water filters are mainly equipped with ultrafiltration hollow filer membranes.  Domestic water filtration systems have microfiltration hollow fiber membranes. In microfiltration a membrane pore diameter of 0.1 micrometers cuts-off microorganisms like germs and bacteria, Giardia cysts and other intestinal parasites, as well removing sediments. Ultrafiltration membranes are capable of removing not only bacteria, but also viruses.

Hollow fibers are commonly used substrates for specialized bioreactor systems, with the ability of some hollow fiber cartridges to culture billions of anchorage-dependent cells within a relatively low (<100 mL) bioreactor volume.

Hollow fibers can be used for drug efficacy testing in cancer research, as an alternative to the traditional, but more expensive, xenograft model.

Hollow fiber membranes are used in Membrane oxygenators in extracorporeal membrane oxygenation which oxygenates blood, replacing lungs in critically ill patients.

See also
Membrane
List of synthetic polymers
Reverse Osmosis
Nanofiltration
Ultrafiltration
Microfiltration

References

Polymer chemistry
Membrane technology